The Quality Cafe (also known as Quality Diner) is a now-defunct diner at 1236 West 7th Street in Los Angeles, California. The restaurant ceased to function as a diner in late 2006 but has appeared as a location featured in a number of Hollywood films, including Million Dollar Baby, Training Day, Old School, Se7en, Ghost World, Gone in 60 Seconds, The Stepfather, What's Love Got to Do with It, Sex and Death 101, and Catch Me If You Can. It was also featured in Season 1 of the 2007 television series Mad Men, in the episode "5G".
It was completely refurbished in 2014 and transformed into a bar of the Teragram Ballroom, a music theatre.

Film appearances

What's Love Got to Do with It (1993), the life of Ike and Tina Turner, starring Laurence Fishburne and Angela Bassett
 Se7en (1995), starring Morgan Freeman and Gwyneth Paltrow
 B*A*P*S (1997), starring Halle Berry and Natalie Desselle
Another Day in Paradise (1998), starring James Woods, Melanie Griffith, Vincent Kartheiser and Natasha Gregson Wagner
Gone in 60 Seconds (2000), starring Nicolas Cage and Grace Zabriskie
Coyote Ugly (2000), starring Piper Perabo and Tyra Banks. Café scène in Danbala diner, with dancing scène of Tyra Banks. Partially refurbished to look like a diner in China Town, New York.
 Training Day (2001), starring Denzel Washington and Ethan Hawke
 Ghost World (2001), starring Scarlett Johansson and Thora Birch
 Catch Me If You Can (2002), starring Tom Hanks
 The Rules of Attraction (film) (2002), starring James Van Der Beek and Thomas Ian Nicholas
 Old School (2003), starring Luke Wilson and Ellen Pompeo
 Million Dollar Baby (2004), starring Morgan Freeman and Hilary Swank
 Mr and Mrs Smith (2005), starring Brad Pitt and Vince Vaughn, second scène starring also Angelina Jolie
 Sex and Death 101 (2007), starring Winona Ryder and Simon Baker
 The Heartbreak Kid (2007), starring Ben Stiller and Malin Akerman
 Reign Over Me (2007), starring Adam Sandler, Don Cheadle and John de Lancie
 The Midnight Meat Train (2008), starring Leslie Bibb and Bradley Cooper
 The Stepfather (2009), starring Dylan Walsh and Penn Badgley
 500 Days of Summer (2009), starring Zooey Deschanel and Joseph Gordon-Levitt
 Devil (2010), starring Chris Messina
 The Roommate (2011), starring Leighton Meester and Minka Kelly
 Honey 2 (2011), dance movie
 The exterior also appeared in Atlas Shrugged (2010) and in You Got Served (2004)

Appearances in TV series

 Beyond Belief: Fact or Fiction Stories: The Candlestick,  The Diner (1997)
 Numb3rs, Episode: Blowback (2008)
 Castle Episodes: Sucker Punch (2010) and Watershed (2013)
 CSI: New York Episode: Outside Man (2004), Sweet Jane (2007)
 Mad Men Several episodes, including: 5G, Ladies Room, To Have and to Hold, Christmas Waltz
 Lie to Me, Episode: Headlock (2010)

Other appearances

Coca-Cola commercial Share the Magic (2009) by Mike L Murphy
Pepsi Max commercial 2pointZero (2010), a remake of the famous cola war commercial of 1995
Joe's Diner, about 20 promos for the NFL Network matches during the season 2006-2007 and a TV commercial "Cable Guy"
Monk and Psych promo Dead Zone Cafe
Chevrolet Cobalt commercial "Ball" (2005)
"Cold Beverage" music video by G. Love & Special Sauce (1994)

See also
 Johnie's Coffee Shop, a similar eating establishment featured in a number of Hollywood movies
 Johnie's Broiler

References

External links
Quality Cafe (7th Street location) in video mash-up at Screen Junkies

2006 disestablishments in California
Buildings and structures demolished in 2014
Defunct restaurants in Los Angeles
History of Los Angeles
Restaurants disestablished in 2006